Matthew Pritchett MBE (born 14 July 1964) is a British pocket cartoonist who has worked on The Daily Telegraph newspaper under the pen name Matt since 1988.

Early life and education
Pritchett's father Oliver Pritchett, who was a columnist for The Telegraph for several decades, is the son of the writer V. S. Pritchett. Matt's sister is screenwriter Georgia Pritchett.

Pritchett attended a grammar school in south-east London before studying graphics at Saint Martin's School of Art. He began working as a waiter in a pizza restaurant, and began drawing cartoons in his spare time. His first cartoon was published in the New Statesman, and he soon began drawing cartoons for The Telegraph diary. He had considered becoming a film-cameraman, but gave up after realising he had misunderstood the role.

Career
Following the death of Mark Boxer in 1988, Pritchett was hired by Max Hastings to be The Telegraph's new cartoonist. His first cartoon in this role came the day after the newspaper was printed with the wrong date, leading them to make a front-page apology accompanied by a cartoon stating "I hope I have a better Thursday than I did yesterday".

He was appointed an MBE in the 2002 New Year Honours "for services to Journalism", and in 2005, Press Gazette inducted him into their Hall of Fame as one of the 40 most influential journalists of the previous four decades.

He has won the British Press Awards' "Cartoonist of the Year" several times, and has been a nominee many other times. His work has also been published in Punch.

Personal life
Pritchett is married to Pascale Smets, a Belgian former fashion designer. They met whilst studying at Saint Martin's, and have three daughters and a son together. His wife's sister, Benedicte, is married to Martin Newland, a former editor of The Telegraph.

Published works

Awards
British Press Awards (The Press Awards after 2010): "Cartoonist of the Year" (2000, 2008, 2009, 2019)
The Press Awards: "The Journalists' Charity Award" (2014)

References

External links
 Telegraph cartoons
 Biography at the British Cartoon Archive

1964 births
British comedians
Living people
Members of the Order of the British Empire
Punch (magazine) cartoonists
Alumni of Saint Martin's School of Art
British cartoonists